Josh Bycel is a television writer/producer. He has worked on such shows as Veronica's Closet, It's All Relative, Andy Barker P.I., and American Dad!. He was hired as the executive producer and co-showrunner (along with Bill Lawrence) for the final season of Scrubs. He was most recently a writer and executive producer on Happy Endings, The Big Show Show, and Solar Opposites. Bycel once wrote column for The Huffington Post in 2016.

Writer
2020: Solar Opposites (writer/executive producer)
The Booster Manifold
The Lake House Device 
The Solar Opposites Almost Get An Xbox
The Gargoyle Ray
The Fog of Pupa
2020: The Big Show Show (writer/executive producer)
Prototype
The Big Brain
2018: LA to Vegas (writer)
Things to Do in Vegas When You're Grounded
2011–13: Happy Endings (writer/executive producer)
Sabado Free-Gante 
Four Weddings and a Funeral (Minus Three Weddings and One Funeral
The Code War
Blax, Snake, Home
Your Couples Friends & Neighbors 
The Quicksand Girlfriend
2009–10: Scrubs (co-head writer/showrunner) (season 9)
Our Drunken Friend
The Guy's Manual  (TV pilot) (creator)
2007–09: Psych 
Any Given Friday Night at 10PM, 9PM Central 
The Greatest Adventure in the History of Basic Cable 
There's Something About Mira
And Down the Stretch Comes Murder 
2006–07: American Dad!
The Vacation Goo 
Camp Refoogee 
2007: Andy Barker, P.I.
The Big No Sleep  
2006: The 78th Annual Academy Awards - contributing writer
2004: Father of the Pride 
2003–04. It's All Relative
Who's Camping Now 
Swangate  
Take Me Out  
2003:Kid Notorious 
The F-You Soup 
2002:Do Over 
Star Search  
2000: Bette 
I Love This Game  
In My Life 
1998–99: Veronica's Closet
Veronica's Sliding Doors 
Veronica Plays House 
Veronica's Great Model Search

Producer
20. The Big Show Show - executive producer
11-12. Happy Endings - co-executive producer
09-10. Scrubs - executive producer/co-showrunner (season 9)
The Guy's Manual - executive producer
07-09. Psych - co-executive producer (season 3)/supervising producer (season 2)
06-07. American Dad! - supervising producer
07 Andy Barker P.I. - consulting producer
03-04. It's All Relative - producer
03. Kid Notorious - consulting producer
02. Do Over - co-producer
00. Bette - co-producer

References

American television producers
American television writers
American male television writers
Living people
Place of birth missing (living people)
Year of birth missing (living people)